John Mariucci (May 8, 1916 – March 23, 1987) was an American ice hockey player, administrator and coach. Mariucci was born in Eveleth, Minnesota. He attended the University of Minnesota where he played for both the hockey and football teams. He was named an All-American in hockey in 1940.  Mariucci was inducted into the inaugural 1973 class of the United States Hockey Hall of Fame and was elected to the Hockey Hall of Fame as a builder in 1985.

Playing career
After starring for the Eveleth hockey and football teams, Mariucci went to college at the University of Minnesota where he played both sports – leading his hockey squad to an undefeated AAU championship in 1940. Mariucci played for the Chicago Black Hawks for five seasons and was the team captain in 1945–46 and 1947–48. Mariucci was known primarily as a defensive-minded bruiser, finishing with only 11 goals and 34 assists in 223 games, but totaled 308 penalty minutes. He lost three seasons while serving in World War II (1942–43 through 1944–45), but played two seasons for the United States Coast Guard Cutters in the Eastern Amateur Hockey League. Mariucci's best season with the Black Hawks came in 1946–47 when he played in 52 of the team's 60 games and finished with 9 goals and 11 assists and his 110 penalty minutes were second in the league to Gus Mortson.

On October 28, 1948, Chicago traded Mariucci to the St. Louis Flyers of the American Hockey League for cash. After one season in St. Louis, on September 4, 1949, Mariucci was traded to the Minneapolis Millers in the United States Hockey League (USHL), again for cash. He spent the 1950–51 season with the USHL St. Paul Saints and then returned to the Millers (this time in the All-American Hockey League) for the 1951–52 season before retiring.

Coaching career
After his professional playing career ended, Mariucci became the head coach of the Minnesota Golden Gophers hockey team. He was noted for not attempting to sign Canadian players for his hockey teams, but instead relying on home-grown talent from Minnesota. This helped to grow youth and high school hockey programs in the state of Minnesota. He was coach at the university from the 1952–53 season until the 1965–66 season, except for the 1955–56 season in which he was the head coach of the US Olympic team that won a silver medal. Mariucci's best Gopher team came in 1953–54 when Minnesota would advance all the way to the NCAA finals before losing to Rensselaer Polytechnic Institute, 5–4 in overtime.

In 1967, he was named the assistant to the general manager for the Minnesota North Stars, with Glen Sonmor becoming the Gophers' coach. He eventually worked for Lou Nanne, one of his Gopher Hockey players, and held the position with the North Stars until his death in 1987. He returned to the international scene as the head coach of the United States team at the 1976 and 1977 Ice Hockey World Championships.

He was involved in a bizarre confrontation with Nanne during the 1977 championships. After loudly criticizing Nanne during the game against the Soviet Union, Nanne responded by charging his coach, which led to a fist fight while the game continued. After the game finished, the fight continued until both men were separated by players and officials.

The University of Minnesota honored him by first renaming the hockey arena in Williams Arena after him and later when a new hockey arena was opened in 1993, the school transferred his name to that one as well, Mariucci Arena.

In 1983, the John Mariucci Award, began to be awarded to the Minnesota High school coach of the year, as selected by the state's hockey coaches, as Mariucci is immortalized as the "Godfather of Minnesota Hockey".

Upon his death, the Minnesota North Stars wore a memorial round patch, with initials JM within, for parts of the 1987–1988 season.

Career statistics

Head coaching record

References

External links
 
  Gopher Hockey History Coaches Info
 John Mariucci Award

1916 births
1987 deaths
American men's ice hockey defensemen
American people of Italian descent
Chicago Blackhawks captains
Chicago Blackhawks players
Hockey Hall of Fame inductees
Ice hockey people from Minnesota
Sportspeople from Eveleth, Minnesota
Lester Patrick Trophy recipients
Minnesota Golden Gophers football players
Minnesota Golden Gophers men's ice hockey coaches
Minnesota Golden Gophers men's ice hockey players
Minnesota North Stars executives
Players of American football from Minnesota
St. Louis Flyers players
United States Coast Guard Cutters players
United States Hockey Hall of Fame inductees
United States men's national ice hockey team coaches
United States Coast Guard personnel of World War II
Ice hockey coaches from Minnesota
Ice hockey players from Minnesota